Crabapple, a term used for several species of Malus in the family Rosaceae

Crabapple may also refer to:
 Molly Crabapple (born 1983), American artist, author and entrepreneur
 Crabapple, Georgia, one of the oldest parts of Fulton County, Georgia
 Crabapple, Texas, an unincorporated farming and ranching community 10.5 miles north of Fredericksburg
 Crabapple Middle School, a Fulton County school located in Roswell, Georgia

See also 
 Edna Krabappel, a fictional character from the animated TV series The Simpsons
 Applecrab, a hybrid of domestic apples with wild crabapples